Kentucky Route 2121 (KY 2121) is a  state highway in Owensboro that begins at a junction with KY 2698 following Southtown Boulevard. It goes next to KY 2127 (Todd Bridge Road). It makes its way to a junction with KY 2699 (Goetz Drive). The highway ends at U.S. Route 431 (US 431).

References

State highways in Kentucky
Transportation in Daviess County, Kentucky